Conférence des directeurs des écoles françaises d'ingénieurs (CDEFI) is French for "Conference of Deans of French Schools of Engineering".

The CDEFI is a French national institution that represents all engineering institutions that are accredited by the Commission des titres d'ingénieur (CTI) to deliver the French Diplôme d'Ingénieur.

The conference was originally an advisory body, established in 1976 and governed by Articles D.233-D.233-6 to 12 of the French Education Code, widely revised by Decree No. 2006-428 of 11 April 2006, which broadens the scope. It was then chaired by the law minister in charge of Higher Education.

Its president is Jacques Fayolle, Director of Télécom Saint-Étienne. The CDEFI board also consists of three Vice-presidents: Emmanuel Duflos, Director of École centrale de Lille; Jean-Michel Nicolle, Director of EPF; Sophie Mougard, Director of École des ponts ParisTech.

See also
Commission nationale de la certification professionnelle
Conférence des grandes écoles (CGE)
École nationale supérieure d'ingénieurs du Mans
Education in France
Grandes écoles

References

External links

Educational organizations based in France
Engineering universities and colleges in France
Grandes écoles
C
ParisTech
Government agencies established in 1976
Organizations established in 1976
1976 establishments in France